Sarnaveh Changizi (also Romanized as Sarnāveh Changīzī; also known as Rashnow) is a village in Boluran Rural District, Darb-e Gonbad District, Kuhdasht County, Lorestan Province, Iran. At the 2006 census, its population was 75, in 13 families.

References 

Towns and villages in Kuhdasht County